

Roseto may refer to:

Places

Italy
Roseto Capo Spulico
Roseto degli Abruzzi
Roseto Valfortore

United States
Roseto, Pennsylvania

Sports 
Roseto Sharks, an Italian professional basketball team from Roseto, Abruzzo, Italy established in 1946 which has used several names all of which include "Roseto"

See also 
 Rossetto (disambiguation)